Jump Hill is a mountain located in the Catskill Mountains of New York north-northeast of Roxbury. Ferris Hill is located east and Moresville Range is located west of Jump Hill.

References

Mountains of Delaware County, New York
Mountains of New York (state)